Acontias meleagris, the Cape legless skink, is a species of skink found in the southern Cape of South Africa. It has no limbs, like most members of the subfamily Acontinae.

Its slender, tube-shaped body is golden-brown with tiny black spots. These spots fuse into longitudinal stripes in some specimens. It is usually found burrowing in dry sand as well as beneath boulders, dead trees and other detritus. It gives birth to two to four young in summer.

References

Further reading

 
 

m
Skinks of Africa
Endemic reptiles of South Africa
Fynbos
Natural history of Cape Town
Reptiles described in 1758
Taxa named by Carl Linnaeus